Film Score Monthly is an online magazine (and former print magazine) founded by editor-in-chief and executive producer Lukas Kendall in June 1990 as The Soundtrack Correspondence List. It is dedicated to the art of film and television scoring.

Film Score Monthly released 250 film and television scores on CD between 1996 and 2013. The International Film Music Critics Association named it Soundtrack Label of the Year in 2004 and Film Music Record Label of the Year in 2005.

History

In September 1991, Film Score Monthly began as The Soundtrack Club, a pamphlet sized publication maintained by Lukas Kendall, who was attending Amherst College at the time. In June 1992, the publication was renamed Film Score Monthly and, upon Kendall's graduation in 1996, relocated its base of operations to Los Angeles. At the same time Film Score Monthly revamped its format, introduced full-color covers, increased its length and enjoyed the peak of its circulation. FSM existed in this guise for nearly a decade.

In 2005, it was announced that the magazine would cease publication of the print edition and move online-only where it could include multi-media content and address the technological advances inherent to the Web in the 21st century.

Regular staff includes: Managing Editor, Tim Curran; Executive Editor, Jon Kaplan; Editor in Absentia, Jeff Bond; Contributor at Large, Doug Adams; Creative Advisor, Joe Sikoryak; Editorial Consultant, Al Kaplan.

In 2013, backissues of the print edition of Film Score Monthly were put online free of charge.
 Print backissues 1990–2005

Podcasts
In 2005, Film Score Monthly began producing a podcast, available through the online magazine, on iTunes (as well as other podcatchers) and on websites hosting direct downloads. Many of the magazine contributors participate in these podcast discussions. The official FSM podcast archive is hosted here.

CD catalog
Film Score Monthly released film and television scores on CD from 1996 to 2013. Many are scores of historical significance; some date back half a century or more. A detailed discography and notes are available on the official site.

Awards
2009 Best Film Music Compilation Album or Box Set – David Raksin at M-G-M – International Film Music Critics Association
2005 Film Music Record Label of the Year – International Film Music Critics Association
2005 Best CD – The Thing From Another World – Rondo Hatton Classic Horror Awards
2004 Best New Release of a Previously Existing Soundtrack – Mutiny on the Bounty – International Film Music Critics Association
2004 Soundtrack Label of the Year – International Film Music Critics Association

See also

References

External links
 Official site

Film magazines published in the United States
Monthly magazines published in the United States
Online music magazines published in the United States
American record labels
Defunct magazines published in the United States
Magazines established in 1990
Magazines disestablished in 2011
Magazines published in Los Angeles
Online magazines with defunct print editions
Record labels established in 1998
Soundtrack record labels
Soundtrack mass media